Giolla na Naomh Mac Aodhagáin, Irish scribe and historian, died c. 1443.

A member of the Mac Aodhagáin family of bards, Giolla na Naomh was a professor of Irish in Ormond; he may have acted in a legal capacity for the Earl of Ormond.

He was responsible for the compilation of the Fragmentary Annals of Ireland, which he wrote on a vellum manuscript. In 1643, they were copied for Rev. John Lynch of Galway by Dubhaltach Mac Fhirbhisigh. The original manuscript is now lost but a copy survives of Mac Fhirbhisigh's text. The manuscript (MS. 7, c. n. 17) is incomplete and includes five fragments of annals beginning in 573 and ending in 914.

In 1309, a direct ancestor with the same name, Giolla na Naomh Mac Aodhagáin ollav of Connacht in Law and a universal master equally skilled in all arts, was killed in the retinue of Aedh mac Eoghain Ó Conchobair king of Connacht by the Clan Murtagh O'Conor. The Mac Aodhagáin family moved south from Connacht into Ormond after his death.

External links
 https://web.archive.org/web/20110124205311/http://www.clanegan.org/CR/MichaelJSEgan2008.pdf

References
 Radner, Joan N., "Writing history: Early Irish historiography and the significance of form", Celtica, volume 23, pp. 312–325. (etext (pdf)) 

Irish scribes
1443 deaths
Medieval Gaels from Ireland
15th-century Irish historians
People from County Tipperary
Year of birth unknown
Irish-language writers